Point Partridge is the most westerly point of Whidbey Island, the largest island in Puget Sound.  The point lies north of the Fort Ebey military reservation and south of West Beach.  The primary importance of Point Partridge is as the northern and eastern reference point for the dividing line between Puget Sound and the Strait of Juan de Fuca. The other reference is Point Wilson.

The origin of the name is not known for certain. According to G.H. Anderson, the point was named by George Vancouver in 1792, to honor the family of Vancouver's sister-in-law, Martha Partridge, the daughter of Henry Partridge. The Spanish explorer Manuel Quimper had named the point two years before Vancouver, calling it "Menendez".

References

Partridge
Landforms of Island County, Washington
Landforms of Puget Sound